Norman Thomas Linebarger (born January 24, 1963) is an American businessman in the diesel engine industry.

Education
Linebarger has joint undergraduate degrees in management engineering from Claremont McKenna College and mechanical engineering from Stanford University. He has an MSc in manufacturing systems from the School of Engineering and an MBA from the Graduate School of Business.

Career
Linebarger began his career as an investment analyst and investment manager at Prudential Financial. He then took an internship at Cummins, joining the company full-time in 1993. During this time he held a variety of roles, including product manager of Fuel Systems Plant, then managing 60-member staff.

Since 2012, Linebarger has served as chairman and chief executive officer of Cummins. Previous positions held at the firm include executive vice president, then president, of Power Generation Business; vice president; chief financial officer; and vice president of Supply Chain Management. He was also one of the "100 CEO leaders in STEM" by STEMblog.

Boards
In 2008, Linebarger joined the Harley Davidson board of directors. He also sits on the Board at the Energy Systems Network. Linebarger is a principal of the American Energy Innovation Council.

Personal life
Born in Los Altos, California, Linebarger is married to Michele. They have two daughters.

References

Businesspeople from Indiana
Cummins people
Harley-Davidson people
1963 births
Living people
People from Los Altos, California
Claremont McKenna College alumni
Stanford University alumni